Paul Maurice Pallary (9 March 1869, in Mers-el-Kebir, French Algeria – 9 January 1942, in Oran, Vichy French Algeria) was a French-Algerian malacologist.

His pioneering research on molluscs was mainly concentrated in the western part of the Mediterranean Sea and in the Middle East. He was a prolific writer on malacofauna. But his interests also extended to other fields of zoology, geology and in particular the prehistory of Northern Africa. He became known as the "Dean of North African Prehistory." In 1892 he discovered, together with François Doumergue, several paleolithic and neolithic caves at Cuartel and Kouchet El Djir.

He named more than 100 mollusc species and even a few genera (Adansonia Pallary, 1902; Corbula (Physoida) Pallary, 1900; Orania Pallary, 1900) 

Ten species have been named in his honour, some of which have become synonyms: 
 Arbacina pallaryi Gauthier, 1897 : synonym of Genocidaris maculata A. Agassiz, 1869
 Cirsotrema pallaryi de Boury, 1912 : synonym of Cirsotrema cochlea (Sowerby G.B. II, 1844)
 Columbella pallaryi Dautzenberg, 1927 : synonym of Mitrella pallaryi (Dautzenberg, 1927)
 Cythara pallaryi Nordsieck, 1977 : synonym of Mangiliella pallaryi (Nordsieck, 1977) accepted as Mangelia pallaryi (Nordsieck, 1977)
 Mangelia pallaryi (Nordsieck, 1977)
 Mangiliella pallaryi (Nordsieck, 1977) : synonym of Mangelia pallaryi (Nordsieck, 1977)
 Mitrella pallaryi (Dautzenberg, 1927)
 Raphitoma pallaryi Nordsieck, 1977
 Salmo pallaryi Pellegrin, 1924 : synonym of Salmo trutta macrostigma (Duméril, 1858)
 Turbonilla pallaryi Dautzenberg, 1910

Publications
This is a selection from his numerous publications :
 Les faunes malacologiques pliocène et quaternaire des environs d’Oran. – Comptes r. Assoc. franç. Avanc. Sci. [Marseille], 20 (1): 202-203, 1891
 Les faunes malacologiques pliocène et quaternaire des environs d’Oran. – Comptes r. Assoc. franç. Avanc. Sci. [Marseille], 20 (2): 383-387, 1891
 Hélices nouvelles du département d’Oran. – Comptes r. Assoc. franç. Avanc. Sci. [Caen], 23 (1): 178-179., 1894
 Deuxième contribution à l'étude de la faune malacologique du Nord Ouest de l'Afrique, Journal de Conchyliologie, Paris 1898
 Les cyclostomes du nord-ouest de l'Afrique, La Feuille des Jeunes Naturalistes, 1898
 Coquilles marines du littoral du département d'Oran, Journal de Conchyliologie, Paris 1900
 Sur les mollusques fossiles terrestres, fluviatiles et saumatres de l'Algérie, P. Naud, 1901
 Addition à la faune malacologique du golfe de Gabès, Journal de Conchylogie, Paris, 1904
 Caractères généraux des industries de la pierre dans l'Algérie occidentale, L'Homme Préhistorique, 3° année, n° 2, pp. 33–43, 1905
 Le préhistorique saharien, L Anthropologie, 1907
 Recherches palethnologiques sur le littoral du Maroc en 1906, L'Anthropologie, 1907
 Instructions pour les recherches préhistoriques dans le nord-ouest de l'Afrique, A. Jourdan, 1909
 Catalogue des mollusques du littoral méditerranéen de d'Égypte, Institut égyptien, 1912
 Sur la Faune de l'ancienne lagune de Tunis, Bull. Soc. Hist. nat. Afrique Nord, 1912
 Catalogue de la faune malacologique d'Égypte, Institut égyptien, 1913
 Supplément à la faune malacologique terrestre et fluviatile de l'Égypte, Imprimerie de l'Institut français, 1924
 Notes on some terrestrial mollusca from the hinterland of Makalla, The Geography and Geology of Makalla, South Arabia, 1925
 Explication des planches de JC Savigny, Imprimerie de l'Institut français, 1926
 Première addition à la faune malacologique de la Syrie,  Imprimerie de l'Institut français, 1929
 Marie Jules-César Savigny: sa vie et son oeuvre, Impr. de l'Institut français, 1934
 Deuxième addition à la faune malacologique de la Syrie, Imprimerie de l'Institut français, 1939

References

 Fischer, P.-H. & E. Fischer, 1946. Nécrologie. Paul Pallary. 9 Mars 1869-9 Janvier 1942.― Journal de Conchyliologie 87 (1): 5-27
 Ruud A. Bank & Henk P.M.G. Menkhorst, A revised bibliography of the malacological papers of Paul Pallary

French malacologists
1869 births
Pieds-Noirs
1942 deaths
People from Oran Province